Piccolo mondo antico (literally: Little Ancient World), known in English as Old-Fashioned World , is a 1941 Italian drama film directed by Mario Soldati and based on the 1895 novel by Antonio Fogazzaro. It belongs to the movies of the calligrafismo style.

Plot summary
During the Italian Risorgimento (mid-nineteenth century), in Austrian-occupied Lombardy, Franco Maironi (Massimo Serato), a young man from an aristocratic family, decides to marry Luisa (Alida Valli), a humble clerk's daughter, against his grandmother, the Marquess Orsola Maironi's wishes. The old lady makes the life of the newly married couple miserable (she destroys the will which would grant Franco his wealth, and causes Luisa's uncle to lose his job, as he was helping them). In the meantime, Luisa gives birth to little Maria. Franco is forced to go to Turin in search of a job. During his absence, Luisa's daughter drowns in Lake of Lugano and she is almost driven mad. Franco returns home for a short time but Luisa reacts coldly towards him. During the Second Italian War of Independence Franco becomes a volunteer soldier in the fight against Austrian and again meets his wife by Lake Maggiore. Despite Luisa's coldness, Franco is sure she still loves him. Aware that he might die in the war, he makes love to her one last time, leaving her pregnant.

Cast

External links
 

1941 films
Italian historical drama films
1940s Italian-language films
Films directed by Mario Soldati
1940s historical drama films
Films set in the 19th century
Films based on Italian novels
Films produced by Carlo Ponti
Italian black-and-white films
Films scored by Enzo Masetti
1940s Italian films